Konosuke Yanagimoto (柳本幸之介, Yanagimoto Kōnosuke, born 24 November 2003) is a Japanese swimmer. He competed in the men's 4 × 200 metre freestyle relay at the 2020 Summer Olympics.

References

External links
 

2003 births
Living people
Japanese male freestyle swimmers
Olympic swimmers of Japan
Swimmers at the 2020 Summer Olympics
People from Imari, Saga
Sportspeople from Saga Prefecture
21st-century Japanese people